The 1964 United States presidential election in North Dakota took place on November 3, 1964, as part of the 1964 United States presidential election. Voters chose four representatives, or electors, to the Electoral College, who voted for president and vice president.

North Dakota was won by incumbent President Lyndon B. Johnson (D–Texas), with 57.97% of the popular vote, against Senator Barry Goldwater (R–Arizona), with 41.88% of the popular vote, a 16.09% margin of victory.

As of 2020, this is the last time that North Dakota has voted for a Democratic presidential nominee, as well as the last time that a Democrat would carry the following counties: Burleigh, Ward, Stark, Williams, Stutsman, Richland, Barnes, Pembina, Bottineau, McKenzie, McHenry, Dickey, Wells, LaMoure, Bowman, Hettinger, Burke, Oliver, Billings, and Slope.

Results

Results by county

See also
 United States presidential elections in North Dakota

References

North Dakota
1964
1964 North Dakota elections